Subroto K Porel (born 10 May 1951) is a former Indian cricketer and umpire. He stood in eight ODI games between 1994 and 2002.

See also
 List of One Day International cricket umpires

References

External links

1951 births
Living people
Indian One Day International cricket umpires
Cricketers from Kolkata
Indian cricketers
Services cricketers
Bengal cricketers
East Zone cricketers